PT EZRI Damai Sejahtera also known as EZRI, is a passenger bus company from Pekalongan, Indonesia. The company serves a number of cities on the island of Java by crossing the northern coast of Java.

History 
PO EZRI was founded in the mid-1967 with an initial capital of 2 Ford Metcek fleets (designation at that time, with the type of body such as Adi Putro or Morodadi Prima bodybuilder). Beginning to open a transportation business, the company from Pekalongan serves its first route, Tegal-Pekalongan-Semarang. Its name stands for Elingo Zaman Revolusi Indonesia (Javanese of "Remember of the Indonesian Revolutionary Period"); it can also be interpreted as one of the names of the heavenly birds according to the Bible.

In the hands of Lo Sien Tong (better known as Mr. Tong) and Kereen Indrawati, which were originally with the second Ford fleet, the fleet continues to grow to 8 units, all of which are Ford vehicles.

Expansion was carried out, the Jakarta-Yogyakarta route became a mainstay.

The developing routes are Cirebon - Surabaya - Malang, Tegal - Kepanjen, Jakarta - Pekalongan, Jakarta - Semarang, Jakarta - Solo, Jakarta - Jogja, and Bogor - Klaten.

As for the philosophical name etymology, it all cannot be separated from the struggle of the EZRI founding parents who maintained Indonesian citizenship.

Not only the Otobus Company, EZRI also has another business, namely batik printing characteristic of Pekalongan such as long cloth (jarit), sarong, baby scarf with various motifs, bright colors and excellent quality.

Acquiring the Colby Persada 

In 1997, PO. EZRI acquired PO. Colby Persada at that time went bankruptcy. Then formalize the PO. Colby Persada became the "biological younger brother" of PO. EZRI.

Since then, both of them began to add distant routes namely Bandung - Malang and Bandung - Denpasar. Entering 2001, the development was very rapid, it was proven by the arrival of 4th Scania K124ib.

The 4 Scania consist of 1 automatic unit, 3 manual units (already covered with a disc). The matic in the Morodadi Prima Carroseries bodybuilding has been sold to Tunggal Daya (tourism coach), the rest which have Adiputro's body are sold to Shantika bus company.

Was present serving the route Bandung - Denpasar in 2009, before finally 4th Scania fleets were sold at once.

It's been half a century PO. EZRI deals in the world of Indonesian transportation. It is a matter of pride for the citizens of the City of Batik Pekalongan that made the number 1 choice bus at that time.

EZRI now 

News was heard that now the cooperative relationship between PO EZRI and PO Colby Persada had broken up.

Disbanded in the sense that PO Colby Persada only focuses on tourism coaches in Bandung while PO EZRI is still faithfully serving the Intercity buses until now. And changed its name to EZRI Damai Sejahtera.

The Cirebon - Surabaya - Malang route still operates with a total fleet of approximately 13 bus fleets from the oldest coller and the new one, Hino RK-8.

There are two elective classes, namely executive and super executive. Executive class seat configuration 2 - 2, AC, reclining seat and toilet. Whereas the super executive class has AC facilities, reclining seat configurations 1-2, TV and Toilet.

Ticket purchases can be made at the EZRI Bus Agent in the Cirebon, Pekalongan, Tegal, Semarang, Yogyakarta, Klaten, Malang, Surabaya, Pulo Gadung, Rawa Buaya.

Not only in Intercity bus es, PO EZRI also survived by spreading its wings on the rental of tourism bus services. With a choice of 59/55/50/45/38/31/21 configuration seat, air-conditioning facilities with or without a toilet.

Even so, PO EZRI has never been recorded as having a fatal accident though. This makes one of the appreciations that Pekalongan residents should be proud of.

Route
PO EZRI currently serves routes in several cities on Java, with two classes of buses, including:

 Cirebon - Surabaya - Malang : Super Executive (seat configuration 2-1)
 Jakarta - Pekalongan : Economy with air conditioner (seat configuration 3-2)
 Bogor - Klaten : off
 Jakarta - Jogjakarta : off

EZRI offices

Jl. A. Yani, Pacar Barat, Pacar, Kec. Tirto, Pekalongan, Jawa Tengah 51151
Telepon : (0285) 421242

Bus fleet 

PO EZRI currently has dozens of bus fleets, among them:

 Isuzu : NQR71
 Hino : RG, RK8
 Mercedes-Benz : OH1521, OH 1525

Former fleet

 Ford
 Mercedes-Benz
 Scania : K124iB

References

Bus companies of Indonesia